Gina Relly (1891–1985) was a French film actress of the silent era.

Selected filmography
 The Face at Your Window (1920)
 Sins of Yesterday (1922)
 The False Dimitri (1922)
 The Two Boys (1924)
 The Cradle of God (1926)

References

Bibliography
 Goble, Alan. The Complete Index to Literary Sources in Film. Walter de Gruyter, 1999.

External links

1891 births
1985 deaths
French film actresses
French silent film actresses
20th-century French actresses
People from Dordogne